Zeli Ismail (born 12 December 1993) is an English professional footballer who plays as a right midfielder for Newtown in the Welsh Premier League. He has represented England at both under-16 and under-17 level.

Career
Born in Kukës, Ismail is a product of Wolverhampton Wanderers' academy, which he joined at the age of 10. The midfielder signed his first professional contract in 2010, and made his senior debut on 25 September 2012 as a substitute in a 6–0 defeat at Chelsea in the League Cup under Ståle Solbakken.

In November 2012 he joined League One side Milton Keynes Dons on loan until 2 January 2013. Here, he made his league debut on 24 November 2012 as a substitute in a 5–1 win over Colchester. Upon the end of his initial loan period he was immediately re-loaned for the remainder of the campaign, but this was ended after a month as Ismail failed to establish himself in their first team.

Following Wolves' relegation to League One at the end of the 2012–13 campaign, Ismail was cited by new manager Kenny Jackett as being part of his plans for the first team. He made his first league appearance for Wolves on 10 August 2013 when he started a 4–0 win against Gillingham, in what was the first of nine league appearances.

Despite these games, Ismail did not hold down a regular place in the Wolves' team and, after not gaining any playing time at all during December 2013, he was loaned to League Two club Burton Albion in January 2014 in a one-month loan deal. He scored his first senior goal on 8 February 2014 to earn a 1–0 victory at Morecambe. His loan stay was subsequently extended until the end of the season, allowing Ismail to play in the League Two Play-off Final for the Brewers, where they lost 1–0 to Fleetwood.

In July 2014, Ismail signed a six-month loan deal with League One Notts County. He scored four times in sixteen appearances before suffering a knee injury against Accrington in November 2014 that meant he had to return to his parent club and undergo surgery.

On 29 July 2015, it was announced that Ismail would return to former club Burton Albion on loan until January. This spell was however hampered by an ankle injury. Having recovered, he joined Oxford United in February 2016 on a month's loan, during which time he made 6 substitute appearances (5 of them in League matches). Ismail was almost immediately loaned out again; this time joining another League Two side, Cambridge United, until the end of the 2015–16 season, where he made 11 appearances, scoring once against Morecambe.

At the conclusion of the campaign his parent club announced they would not be taking up the option of offering Ismail a new contract. He made 12 appearances in total for the club, but none above League One level.

On 25 June 2016 he signed for Bury. He scored his first goal for Bury in an EFL Trophy tie against Morecambe on 30 August 2016.

On 31 August 2017, Ismail joined fellow League One club Walsall on loan until January 2018. Ismail scored his first goal for Walsall in an EFL Trophy tie against West Bromwich Albion Under-23s on 19 September 2017.

He was released by Bury at the end of the 2017–18 season.

After making sixteen league appearances on loan for the club, Ismail joined Walsall permanently on 26 June 2018, signing a one-year deal.

He was released by Walsall at the end of the 2018–19 season.

In June 2019 it was announced that he would sign for Bradford City on 1 July 2019, after signing a one-year contract with the club. He made his debut for the club on 3 September 2019 in an EFL Trophy match against Bolton Wanderers and made his league debut for the club on 7 September 2019 in a 2–1 win against Northampton Town, where he was also sent off.

On 12 May 2021 he was one of nine players that Bradford City announced would leave the club on 30 June 2021 when their contracts expire. He subsequently joined National League North club Hereford.

On 31 January 2022, Ismail signed for Cymru Premier side Newtown.

Career statistics

References

External links
England profile at the FA

1993 births
Living people
People from Kukës
English footballers
England youth international footballers
Wolverhampton Wanderers F.C. players
Milton Keynes Dons F.C. players
Burton Albion F.C. players
Notts County F.C. players
Oxford United F.C. players
Cambridge United F.C. players
Bury F.C. players
Walsall F.C. players
Bradford City A.F.C. players
Hereford F.C. players
Newtown A.F.C. players
National League (English football) players
English Football League players
Albanian emigrants to England
Association football midfielders
Cymru Premier players